Eureqa is a proprietary modeling engine originally created by Cornell's Artificial Intelligence Lab and later commercialized by Nutonian, Inc. The software uses evolutionary search to determine mathematical equations that describe sets of data in their simplest form. This task is generally referred to as symbolic regression in the literature.

Origin and Development 
Since the 1970s, the primary way companies have performed data science has been to hire teams of data scientists, and equip them with tools like R, Python, SAS, and SQL to execute predictive and statistical modeling. In 2007, Michael Schmidt, then a PhD student in Computational Biology at Cornell, believed that the volume of data and complexity of problems that humans could solve were ever-increasing, and the number of data scientists was not. Instead of relying on more people to fill the data science gap, Schmidt and his advisor, Hod Lipson, invented Eureqa, believing machines could extract meaning from data automatically. Eureqa is an artificial intelligence-powered "Virtual Data Scientist" that automatically builds predictive and analytical models, and allows domain experts to rapidly iterate on them. TechCrunch has called Eureqa one of the first examples of Machine Intelligence – the subfield of A.I. that automates the discovery and explanation of answers from data.

In early November 2009 the program was made available to download for free by anyone. Lipson described the machine's benefit in dealing with fields that are overwhelmed with data but lack theory to explain it. In the October 2011 edition of "Physical Biology", Lipson described a yeast experiment that predicted seven known equations. This took place after Lipson had asked scientists from different disciplines to share their work to test Eureqa's versatility.

The program was named Eureqa after Archimedes' famous expression "Eureka!", with the k replaced by a q to evoke the word equation.

Technology 
Eureqa works by creating random equations with the data through evolutionary search. Most of the equations do not fit the data well, but a few of the equations will fit the data better than the others and those will be used as the basis of a new round of several billion more equations until a sufficiently good fit is reached. This has been used to discover formula with "invariant relationships", such as laws of nature.

Reception and Use 
As of 2015, over 80,000 people, including researchers, students, and Fortune 500 companies have made use of the program. People have used the application for many uses, such as analyzing the herding of cattle and understanding the behavior of the stock market.

References

External links 
 
 

Semantic Web
Genetic programming